José María de Jesús Portugal y Serratos (born 1838 in Mexico City) was a Mexican clergyman and prelate for Sinaloa, Saltillo, and then the Roman Catholic Diocese of Aguascalientes. He was appointed bishop in 1888, 1898, and then 1902. He died in 1912.

References 

1838 births
1912 deaths
Mexican Roman Catholic bishops